Wanjuru is a coastal locality in the Cassowary Coast Region, Queensland, Australia.

Geography 
Wanjuru is bounded to the east by Ella Bay and its south-west boundary approximates the ridge of the Seymour Range. Most of the northern, western and southern parts of the locality are within Ella Bay National Park which extends into neighbouring Eubenangee.

References 

Cassowary Coast Region
Coastline of Queensland
Localities in Queensland